Westminster is a city in northern Orange County, California, known for its many Vietnamese refugees who immigrated to the city during the 1980s. They settled largely in Little Saigon, and the city is known as the "capital" of overseas Vietnamese with 36,058 Vietnamese Americans and at 40.2% (2010), the highest municipal prevalence of Vietnamese Americans. The Little Saigon is a district of the town.  Westminster was founded in 1870 by Rev. Lemuel Webber as a Presbyterian temperance colony and was incorporated in 1957.

Westminster is bordered by the city of Seal Beach on the west, by Garden Grove on the north and east, and by Huntington Beach and Fountain Valley on the south. Santa Ana, the county seat of Orange County, is east of Westminster.

Westminster won the All-America City Award in 1996.

In the court case Mendez v. Westminster (1947), a Hispanic man sued the Westminster School District for forcing his daughter, Sylvia Mendez, to attend a school for Mexican children. They eventually won and thus began the process of desegregation. Sylvia Mendez was later awarded the Presidential Medal of Freedom from President Barack Obama on February 15, 2011.

History

Westminster was founded in 1870 by Rev. Lemuel Webber as a Presbyterian temperance colony. The name is derived from the Westminster Assembly of 1643, which established the basic tenets of the Presbyterian faith. During the early years of its history, farmers refused to harvest grapes since they associated grapes with alcohol.

Westminster was incorporated in 1957, at which time it had 10,755 residents. Originally, the city was named Tri-City because it was to be the amalgamation of three cities: Westminster, Barber City, and Midway City. Midway City ultimately refused incorporation, leaving only Barber City to be absorbed into the newly incorporated Westminster. The former Barber City was located in the western portion of the current city of Westminster.

Geography
The San Diego Freeway and a short segment of the Garden Grove Freeway pass through Westminster.

Westminster is bordered by the city of Seal Beach on the west, by Garden Grove on the north and east, and by Huntington Beach and Fountain Valley on the south. Santa Ana, the county seat of Orange County, is east of Westminster, although a small portion of Garden Grove lies between the two cities. Westminster borders the unincorporated area of Midway City, except for a small portion where Midway City borders Huntington Beach on the south. The Little Saigon district of the town is mostly situated between Hazard Avenue and Bolsa Avenue.

Climate

Demographics

2010
At the 2010 census Westminster had a population of 89,701. The racial makeup of Westminster was 32,037 (35.7%) White (25.6% Non-Hispanic White), 849 (0.9%) African American, 397 (0.4%) Native American, 42,597 (47.5%) Asian, 361 (0.4%) Pacific Islander, 10,229 (11.4%) from other races, and 3,231 (3.6%) from two or more races. Hispanic or Latino of any race were 21,176 persons (23.6%). A total of 36,058 residents were of Vietnamese ancestry (40.2% of city residents), the highest concentration of Vietnamese Americans of any community in the United States.

The census reported that 89,031 people (99.3% of the population) lived in households, 381 (0.4%) lived in non-institutionalized group quarters, and 289 (0.3%) were institutionalized.

There were 26,164 households, 10,759 (41.1%) had children under the age of 18 living in them, 14,986 (57.3%) were opposite-sex married couples living together, 3,681 (14.1%) had a female householder with no husband present, 1,810 (6.9%) had a male householder with no wife present.  There were 1,114 (4.3%) unmarried opposite-sex partnerships, and 151 (0.6%) same-sex married couples or partnerships. 4,247 households (16.2%) were one person and 2,170 (8.3%) had someone living alone who was 65 or older. The average household size was 3.40.  There were 20,477 families (78.3% of households); the average family size was 3.74.

The age distribution was 20,920 people (23.3%) under the age of 18, 8,568 people (9.6%) aged 18 to 24, 24,065 people (26.8%) aged 25 to 44, 23,356 people (26.0%) aged 45 to 64, and 12,792 people (14.3%) who were 65 or older.  The median age was 38.7 years. For every 100 females, there were 97.8 males.  For every 100 females age 18 and over, there were 96.4 males.

There were 27,650 housing units at an average density of 2,751.5 per square mile, of the occupied units 15,135 (57.8%) were owner-occupied and 11,029 (42.2%) were rented. The homeowner vacancy rate was 1.5%; the rental vacancy rate was 7.3%.  51,408 people (57.3% of the population) lived in owner-occupied housing units and 37,623 people (41.9%) lived in rental housing units.

During 2009–2013, Westminster had a median household income of $52,633, with 16.7% of the population living below the federal poverty line.

2000
At the 2000 census there were 88,207 people in 26,406 households, including 20,411 families, in the city. The population density was 8,724.2 inhabitants per square mile (3,368.6/km2). The racial makeup of the city was 45.79% White, 0.99% African American, 0.61% Native American, 38.13% Asian, 0.46% Pacific Islander, 10.19% from other races, and 3.84% from two or more races. Hispanic or Latino of any race were 21.70%.

Of the 26,406 households 37.8% had children under the age of 18 living with them, 58.4% were married couples living together, 12.4% had a female householder with no husband present, and 22.7% were non-families. 16.9% of households were one person and 7.4% were one person aged 65 or older. The average household size was 3.32 and the average family size was 3.71.

The age distribution was 25.9% under the age of 18, 8.8% from 18 to 24, 32.6% from 25 to 44, 21.5% from 45 to 64, and 11.2% 65 or older. The median age was 34 years. For every 100 females, there were 99.9 males. For every 100 females age 18 and over, there were 97.9 males.

The median household income was $49,450 and the median family income was $54,399. Males had a median income of $37,157 versus $28,392 for females. The per capita income for the city was $18,218. About 10.7% of families and 13.5% of the population were below the poverty line, including 18.0% of those under age 18 and 7.9% of those age 65 or over.

Government and politics

In the United States House of Representatives, Westminster is in California's 45th congressional district, represented by Republican Michelle Steel.

It has a city council form of local government.

Economy

Top employers
According to the city's 2017 Comprehensive Annual Financial Report, the top employers in the city are:

Business sector

The city's major shopping mall is Westminster Mall, which consists of more than 180 stores. The mall is located south of the 405 freeway, between Goldenwest Street and Edwards Street. Westminster's Little Saigon community is home to the Asian Garden Mall (Phước Lộc Thọ), a large Asian mall.

Since joining the Sequential Brands company, the DVS Shoes footwear brand relocated from Torrance, California to Westminster. The company's headquarters is located on Fenwick Lane.

Education
Four school districts have boundaries that cover parts of Westminster:
 Westminster School District
 Garden Grove Unified School District
 Huntington Beach Union High School District
 Ocean View School District

Landmarks
 A memorial and final resting place for the victims of the Pan Am plane involved in the Tenerife Disaster of March 27, 1977, is located in Westminster.
 The Vietnam War Memorial is located Sid Goldstein Freedom Park, next to the Westminster Civic Center. The project was initiated by Westminster City Councilman Frank G. Fry in 1997 and completed in 2003.
 Final resting place for frontman Bradley Nowell of the band Sublime. Nowell died of a heroin overdose in his San Francisco hotel room on May 25, 1996.
 A statue is dedicated to Trần Hưng Đạo, with the road Bolsa Avenue given an alternative name "Đại Lộ Trần Hưng Đạo", translating to "Trần Hưng Đạo Boulevard".

Notable people and groups

 Harrod Blank, documentary filmmaker
 Jeromy Burnitz, MLB player
 Mike Burns, MLB player
 Paul Caligiuri, retired American soccer player
 Mark Eaton, former Utah Jazz player
 Danny Flores (1929–2006), head of the rock group The Champs
 Ken Hoang, professional video gamer and contestant on Survivor Gabon
 Gerard Huerta, designer of the AC/DC logo and other logos 
 Ryan Klesko, former MLB first baseman
 Nguyễn Cao Kỳ (1930–2011), former Prime Minister of South Vietnam, lived in exile in Westminster, where he ran a liquor store
 Iris Kyle, 10-time overall Ms. Olympia professional bodybuilder
 Trent McDuffie, NFL Cornerback Kansas City Chiefs
 Carlos Palomino, former welterweight boxing champion
 Vang Pao, Hmong former Major General of the Royal Lao Army
 Nam Phan, professional mixed martial artist and a contestant in The Ultimate Fighter: Team GSP vs. Team Koscheck
 Poreotics, dance crew who won ABDC Season 5 in 2010
 Dylan Rieder, American professional skateboarder, artist, and model
 Stafford Repp, American film and television actor
 Westminster Chorus, won the Pavarotti Trophy of Choir of the World 2009
 Geoff Zanelli, prominent Emmy Award-Winning film and TV composer
 Robin Dodson, former world champion pool player and Hall of Fame member.

References

External links

 

 
Cities in Orange County, California
Incorporated cities and towns in California
Little Saigons
Populated places established in 1957
1957 establishments in California